The great spider crab, Hyas araneus, is a species of crab found in northeast Atlantic waters and the North Sea, usually below the tidal zone.

In 1986, two specimens were captured at the South Shetland Islands off the Antarctic Peninsula,  apparently transported by human agency. It has been feared that the species would have an adverse effect on the native fauna, but there have been no further captures from the region since the 1986 specimens.

The great spider crab can moult and get rid of their outer shell/skin. This can take some time but it lets them grow to great size. After they moult they are very vulnerable to predators because of a very soft exoskeleton.

References

Majoidea
Crabs of the Atlantic Ocean
Crustaceans described in 1758
Taxa named by Carl Linnaeus